Anderson Secondary School (ANDSS) is a co-educational government autonomous school in Ang Mo Kio, Singapore offering education for Secondary 1 to Secondary 5. It became an autonomous school in 1994 and was one of the pioneer autonomous schools in Singapore.

History
Anderson Secondary School was founded in 1960 as a girls' primary school. In 1964, it became a girls' secondary school and began admitting boys in 1965. The school has occupied several sites. Previously situated at Stevens Road and Anderson Road (from which it got its name), the school moved to Ang Mo Kio Street 44 in 1984. In December 1993, it moved to its current site, Ang Mo Kio Street 53.

Anderson Secondary School has been used from time to time for educational experiments. In 1994 it was declared an autonomous school for consistent academic performance, and in 1996 it was one of the first schools to use the Students-and-Teachers Workbench project. In 1997 it was chosen as an IT demo school. The school received the School Distinction Award from the Ministry of Education in 2004.

Programme for Rebuilding and Improving Existing Schools 
From 2003 to 2006 the school underwent a Programme for Rebuilding and Improving Existing Schools upgrading project. The school raised funds for a student activity hub, a heritage centre and a multi-purpose studio, upgraded the lecture theatre and classrooms and added a five-storey building.

The final stage of the upgrading process took place in 2005. Some facilities, such as the school hall, cookery rooms and the football field, were ready in July 2006.

A facility called the "Inspire Town" was opened in 2005. This is a room where innovation and creativity is encouraged amongst pupils. Two classrooms were converted into a black box theater for use by drama students.

In 2008, an indoor sports hall was opened.

Uniform and attire 
Girls wear a white blouse and a kelly blue tunic knee-length pinafore. Lower secondary boys wear a pair of short trousers while upper secondary boys wear a pair of white long trousers. Students wear the school badge, with their name tag directly below it. Students wear the school tie on Mondays, and at formal school functions. On Fridays, students are allowed to wear "half-uniform" (PE T-shirt or class T-shirt with uniform bottom). From time to time, if there is an increase in temperature, the school may allow "half-uniform" from Tuesdays to Thursdays.

Discipline 
The Anderson Secondary School Discipline Committee has classified offences committed by students into minor and major offences. Minor offences include being late for school, flaws in personal grooming and use of electronic devices during curriculum time. Major offences include absenteeism, forgery, arson and many others. Punishments for major offences include detention, caning (for boys only) and suspension.

Academic information 
Being an integrated secondary school, Anderson Secondary School offers three academic streams, namely the four-year Express course, as well as the Normal Course, comprising Normal (Academic) and Normal (Technical) academic tracks.

O Level Express Course 
The Express Course is a nationwide four-year programme that leads up to the Singapore-Cambridge GCE Ordinary Level examination.

Normal Course 
The Normal Course is a nationwide 4-year programme leading to the Singapore-Cambridge GCE Normal Level examination, which runs either the Normal (Academic) curriculum or Normal (Technical) curriculum, abbreviated as N(A) and N(T) respectively.

Normal (Academic) Course 
In the Normal (Academic) course, students are offered 5-8 subjects in the Singapore-Cambridge GCE Normal (Academic) Level examination. Compulsory subjects include:
 English Language
 Mother Tongue Language
 Elementary Mathematics
Combined Science (Chemistry & Physics) 
 Combined Humanities (Social Studies & History/Geography) 
Design & Technology/Principles of Accounts/Art

A 5th year leading to the Singapore-Cambridge GCE Ordinary Level examination is available to N(A) students who perform well in their Singapore-Cambridge GCE Normal Level examination. Students can move from one course to another based on their performance and the assessment of the school principal and teachers.

Normal (Technical) Course 
The Normal (Technical) course prepares students for a technical-vocational education at the Institute of Technical Education. Students will offer 5-7 subjects in the Singapore-Cambridge GCE Normal (technical) Level examination. The curriculum is tailored towards strengthening students’ proficiency in English and Mathematics. Students take English Language, Mathematics, Basic Mother Tongue and Computer Applications as compulsory subjects.

Overseas exchange programmes
Overseas exchange programmes are known as Cultural Flexibility Programme:
 Anderson-Winitsuksa STEP Camp, Cultural Exchange & Adventure Camp
 Anderson-Marryatville Drama Educational Exchange
 Anderson-Kagoshima Daiichi High School Sports Exchange
 Anderson-EMAS Overseas Learning Journey, Sabah, Language Immersion & Cultural Exchange
Anderson-SM Sultan Abdul Halim School Language Immersion & Cultural Exchange

Anderson Secondary School was the partner school for South Korea during the inaugural Youth Olympic Games in Singapore.

Co-curricular activities
Uniformed Groups
 National Cadet Corps (Land, boys) 
 National Police Cadet Corps (Land)
 Anderson Girl Guides (girls)

Performing Arts
 Anderson Theatre Circle
 Anderson Military Band
 Chinese Dance (Girls)
 Malay Dance
 Choir

Sports
 Basketball
 Netball (Girls)
 Table Tennis (Girls) 
 Volleyball (Girls)
 Wushu
 Soccer(Boys)

Clubs and Societies
 Infocomm Club
 Robotics Club (Formerly known as Cybernetics)
 Green Club
 Art Club
Sports and Recreation Club
Anderson Science Academy

Student Leadership
 Student Council
 HCE Ambassadors
 Peer Support Leader

School events

Intra-school events

The school organises events such as Cross Country (Term 1) and Arts Fest (before end of Term 4) every year.

The school's Choir and Military Band stages a performance biennially known as VOICES and AMBience respectively,  with the Chinese Dance and Malay Dance team staging a joint performance biennially known as ANDance, with their last concerts in 2014, it has been stopped indefinitely with the current school principal's decision.

Most intra-school events are played at the class level, where students compete in events for their classes. This is done instead of inter-house competition to encourage greater bonding within classes.

Principals
 1964 M.A. Mallal
 1965-1973 Heng Cher Siang 
 1974-1976 Peggy Phang
 1976-1978 Lim Soon Tze
 1979-1980 Betty Lim Hsiu Yun
 1981-1983 Sarwan Singh
 1984-1992 Leong Yop Pooi
 1993-1996 Kwek Hiok Chuang
 1997-2001 Chan-Low Khah Gek
 2002-2005 Tan-Soh Wai Lan
 Dec 2005-2010 Poh-Tham Mun See
 Dec 2010-2015 Mark Lo Khee Tian
 Dec 2015-2021 Tan-Thong May Teng
 Dec 2021- Tan Po Chin

Notable alumni
Adrin Loi: Chairman and CEO, Ya Kun Kaya Toast
Ang Peng Siong: Olympian (swimming)
 Colin Cheong: writer and journalist
 Cruz Teng: Former Programme director & Head of 933FM
Lee Jinjun: Composer, Musician
Louis Chua Kheng Wee: Singaporean politician
William Scorpion: mandopop singer

See also
 Education in Singapore

References

External links 
 

Secondary schools in Singapore
Autonomous schools in Singapore
Schools in Ang Mo Kio
Educational institutions established in 1960
1960 establishments in Malaya